Sclerochorton is a monotypic genus of flowering plants belonging to the family Apiaceae. The only species is Sclerochorton haussknechtii.

Its native range is Iraq to Western Iran.

References

Apiaceae
Monotypic Apiaceae genera